Emmanuel José Rivière (born 3 March 1990) is a Martiniquais professional footballer. Rivière primarily plays in the lead striker role, but can also operate on wings. He was a French youth international having played at all levels before switching to represent the Martinique national team.

Club career

Early career
Rivière began his football career playing on the French overseas department of Martinique playing for local side Espoir Sainte-Luce in the commune of Sainte-Luce. He attracted interest from French clubs on the mainland after his performances at the annual Coupe Nationale des 14 ans, which was held at the Clairefontaine academy. Notable clubs that scouted him included Paris Saint-Germain, Lyon and Saint-Étienne. The player signed for Saint-Étienne citing the club's history stating, "The ASSE is legendary in Martinique. They're a very big club. My family was happy to see me sign here. My father, who follows a lot of football, talks about them often."

Saint-Étienne
During his early years at the club, former Saint-Étienne striker and fellow Martiniquais Frédéric Piquionne served as a mentor. Rivière made his debut in the reserves at the age of 16. During the summer of 2008, he signed his first professional contract agreeing to a three-year deal, which kept him with the Rhône-Alpes-based outfit until 2011.

For the duration of 2008, Rivière did not see any playing time with the senior team; he featured only in the reserves. He made his professional debut on 3 January 2009 in a Coupe de France match against Bordeaux. He started the match and played the full 90 minutes with Saint-Étienne picking up a 1–0 victory courtesy of a goal from Bafétimbi Gomis in the 74th minute. He made his league debut on 31 January in a match against rivals Lyon, coming on as a substitute in the 72nd minute; the match ended in a 1–1 draw. Rivière scored his first career goal for Saint-Étienne on 13 May 2009 in the club's 4–2 victory over Le Havre.

Due to the departure of Gomis, injuries to strikers Ilan and Kevin Mirallas, and the late arrival of the Argentine Gonzalo Bergessio, Rivière started the 2009–10 season as the club's first choice striker. On 15 August, Rivière netted his first goal of the season in the club's 3–1 loss to Toulouse. Following the inclusion of Bergessio into the team, Rivière shifted to the winger role. On 9 January 2010, he scored the opening goal in Saint-Étienne's 4–1 cup victory over Lorient. The following week, he scored the game-winning goal in a 2–1 victory over Grenoble. In February and March, Rivière performed valiantly, scoring five goals in seven matches and also assisting on a goal. Saint-Étienne only lost one of the seven matches played during the span, which lifted the club out of the relegation zone. Rivière scored opening goals in matches against Lyon and Lille, both of which ended in a draw, and scored the game-winning goal against Montpellier. On 5 May, Rivière netted another game-winning goal, this time against Boulogne. The 1–0 result assured Saint-Étienne another campaign in Ligue 1 and also relegated Boulogne.

On 22 July 2010, Rivière signed a three-year contract extension with Saint-Étienne until June 2014. Before signing the agreement, he drew interest from Ligue 1 club Toulouse and German club 1899 Hoffenheim.

Toulouse
On 12 July 2011, French club Toulouse confirmed that Rivière had joined the club on a four-year contract from Saint-Étienne. The transfer fee was priced at €6 million.

Monaco
On 30 January 2013, Rivière joined Monaco on a four-and-a-half-year contract for a fee reported to be around €4 million. He scored his first goal for Monaco on his debut in a 2–0 away win at Arles on 4 February 2013.

He scored in Monaco's first game back in Ligue 1 on 10 August 2013, coming on for James Rodríguez in the 72nd minute and scoring less than ten minutes later, helping the club to a 2–0 victory over Bordeaux. In Monaco's match against Montpellier on 18 August, he scored his first ever career hat-trick as the club eased to a 4–1 victory. He then went on to score against Marseille on 1 September, coming off the bench to net the winning goal.

Newcastle United
On 16 July 2014, Rivière joined Premier League side Newcastle United, signing a four-year contract for an undisclosed fee believed to be in the region of £6 million. He became manager Alan Pardew's fifth signing of the 2014 summer transfer window and upon joining the Tyneside club, Rivière spoke of his excitement of joining the club: "I'm very happy to be here at Newcastle. When the club spoke to me I said yes immediately. It was an easy decision because Newcastle is a big club with great fans and a good stadium."

He made his competitive debut on 17 August in Newcastle's opening match of the league season, a 2–0 defeat to Manchester City; he was substituted for fellow debutant Ayoze Pérez after 83 minutes. His first goals for the club came on 24 September when he scored two goals, including a penalty, to help his side defeat Crystal Palace 3–2 in the third round of the League Cup. Rivière did not score in the league until 16 May, when he was set up by goalkeeper Tim Krul to open the scoring away at Queens Park Rangers, with Newcastle eventually losing 1–2 to their already-relegated opponents at Loftus Road. This represented the player's solitary league goal for Newcastle.

Osasuna
On 31 August 2016, Rivière was loaned to La Liga side CA Osasuna for the 2016–17 season. He finished the season without scoring a goal and returned to Newcastle United at the end of the season.

Metz
On 25 August 2017, Rivière completed a move to French Ligue 1 club FC Metz. He left the club at the end of the 2018–19 season.

Cosenza
On 12 September 2019, Rivière signed a one-year contract with Serie B club Cosenza.

Crotone
On 11 September 2020, Rivière joined Serie A club Crotone for free. He signed a 2-years contract. On 15 October 2021, Crotone announced that Rivière's contract was terminated by the club for the violation of said contract by the player, retroactively back from 13 August 2021.

Career statistics

Club

International goals
Scores and results list Martinique's goal tally first.

Rivière's goal against the United States in the 2021 CONCACAF Gold Cup, on a penalty kick, was the only time the USA conceded a goal in the entire tournament.

Honours

Monaco
 Ligue 2: 2012–13

Metz
 Ligue 2: 2018–19

References

External links

 
 Emmanuel Rivière profile at asse.fr
 
 
 NFT Profile
 
 

1990 births
Living people
People from Le Lamentin
Martiniquais footballers
Martinique international footballers
French footballers
French people of Martiniquais descent
Association football forwards
Ligue 1 players
Ligue 2 players
Premier League players
La Liga players
Serie A players
Serie B players
AS Saint-Étienne players
Toulouse FC players
AS Monaco FC players
Newcastle United F.C. players
CA Osasuna players
FC Metz players
Cosenza Calcio players
F.C. Crotone players
France under-21 international footballers
France youth international footballers
French expatriate footballers
Expatriate footballers in England
Expatriate footballers in Spain
Expatriate footballers in Italy
Martiniquais expatriate sportspeople in England
Martiniquais expatriate sportspeople in Spain
Martiniquais expatriate sportspeople in Italy
2021 CONCACAF Gold Cup players